Anselmo Gomes da Silva (born 22 March 1981) is a Brazilian former hurdler who competed in the 2008 Summer Olympics. His personal best in the 110 metres hurdles is 13.31 achieved in 2005 in Cochabamba.

Competition record

References

External links
 

1981 births
Living people
Brazilian male hurdlers
Olympic athletes of Brazil
Athletes (track and field) at the 2008 Summer Olympics
Universiade medalists in athletics (track and field)
Universiade gold medalists for Brazil
Universiade bronze medalists for Brazil
Medalists at the 2003 Summer Universiade
Athletes (track and field) at the 2007 Pan American Games
Pan American Games athletes for Brazil
21st-century Brazilian people